The 1934 Tennessee Volunteers (variously Tennessee, UT, or the Vols) represented the University of Tennessee in the 1934 college football season. Playing as a member of the Southeastern Conference (SEC), the team was led by head coach Robert Neyland, in his ninth year, and played their home games at Shields–Watkins Field in Knoxville, Tennessee. They finished the season with a record of eight wins and two losses (8–2 overall, 5–1 in the SEC).

Schedule

References

Tennessee
Tennessee Volunteers football seasons
Tennessee Volunteers football